The Perfect Wedding is an independent film co-created by New York Times Bestselling Author Suzanne Brockmann, Edgar Award Finalist Ed Gaffney, and Off-Broadway actor Jason T. Gaffney. In 2013, it won the Bud Abbott Award for Feature Length Comedy at the Garden State Film Festival. It was filmed in 2011 and released on VOD/Streaming and DVD from distributor Wolfe Releasing in 2013.

Background 

The film was created because Brockmann and Gaffney's son, Jason T. Gaffney, were tired of seeing LGBT films that relied on stereotypes for their humor. The writers created a film where being gay was treated as a normal facet of life. The film was directed by Scott Gabriel, and was produced by small or LARGE Productions and Arcadia Creative.

Plot 

The film takes place over Christmas weekend at the Fowler's home where Alana Fowler is planning her wedding to Kirk. Alana and her brother Paul are both adopted by Richard and Meryl Fowler. One of Alana's friends, Roy, who is coming to help with the wedding planning, is an ex of Paul. He doesn't want Paul to see that he is still single all these years later so Roy brings Gavin along to pretend to be his boyfriend. However, Gavin and Paul end up falling in love. In addition to that Richard has just been diagnosed with early onset Alzheimer's. The family has to figure out how to cope with that while planning the perfect wedding.

Cast 

 James Rebhorn - Richard Fowler
 Kristine Sutherland - Meryl Fowler
 Eric Aragon - Paul Fowler
 Jason T. Gaffney - Gavin Greene
 Apolonia Davalos - Alana Fowler
 Brenden Griffin - Kirk
 Annie Kerins - Vicki
 Sal Rendino - Zack
 Roger Stewart - Roy

Reception 

The Perfect Wedding was an official selection at the Sarasota Film Festival (2012), the Spokane International Film Festival (2013), the Garden State Film Festival (2013), the North Carolina Gay & Lesbian Film Festival (2013), the Indiana LGBT Film Festival (2013), and the Long Island Gay & Lesbian Film Festival (2013).

References

External links 
 
 

American LGBT-related films
2012 films
American drama films
Films about weddings
LGBT-related drama films
2012 LGBT-related films
Gay-related films
American Christmas films
2010s English-language films
2010s American films